Johannes Edouard Willem Gozal (16 March 1936 – 30 April 2020) was an Indonesian sprinter. He competed in the 100 metres at the 1956 Summer Olympics and the 1960 Summer Olympics.

References

External links
 

1936 births
2020 deaths
People from Pontianak
Sportspeople from West Kalimantan
Athletes (track and field) at the 1956 Summer Olympics
Athletes (track and field) at the 1960 Summer Olympics
Indonesian male sprinters
Olympic athletes of Indonesia
20th-century Indonesian people